The Corrib gas project is a developed natural gas deposit located in the Atlantic Ocean, approximately  off the northwest coast of County Mayo, Ireland. The project includes a natural gas pipeline and an onshore gas processing plant, which commenced gas production in 2015. During its development, the project attracted considerable opposition.

The Corrib field is Ireland's only domestic source of natural gas production.

History
The deepwater exploration licence No. 2/93 covering four blocks in the Slyne Trough was granted on 1 January 1993 for a period of 11 years to Enterprise Oil and its partners Saga Petroleum Ireland Limited, Statoil Exploration (Ireland) Limited, and Marathon International Petroleum Hibernia Limited. The licence was issued under the licensing terms for offshore oil and gas exploration and development 1992.  The Corrib natural gas field was discovered in 1996.  It was the first reported commercial natural gas discovery in Ireland since the Kinsale Head gas field was discovered in 1971. The first appraisal well was drilled in 1997.  A number of consents and approvals to develop the Corrib Project were issued in 2001.

In 2002, Enterprise Oil was acquired by Royal Dutch Shell who took over the operatorship of the project.  Development of the project began in 2004, but it was delayed in 2005 when locals opposed the project.  Shell announced the suspension of the project to facilitate further discussions with opposing parties. For a year, independent safety reviews were conducted to address various safety concerns in relation to the project.

In 1999, Saga Petroleum became a part of a Norsk Hydro and in 2007 a part of Statoil. In July 2009, Vermilion Energy acquired Marathon Oil's stake in the project.

Until 2018, Royal Dutch Shell was the operator of the project with a 45% ownership stake. In 2018, Shell sold its share of the project to the Canada Pension Plan Investment Board. As part of the transaction, Vermilion Energy became the project's operator and expanded its ownership share to 20%. In 2021, Vermilion acquired Equinor's 36.5% stake for $434 million (€382 million), becoming the majority owner of the gas field.

Development

Royal Dutch Shell proposed to develop the Corrib field as a sub-sea production facility with onshore processing. The project included development of offshore installations, including the wells and subsea facilities, construction of offshore and onshore pipelines, and construction of onshore processing plant at Bellanaboy.

Gas field
The natural gas in the Corrib Gas Field is a very pure form of gas, consisting of approximately 97% methane and ethane. The Corrib gas does not contain hydrogen sulfide and carbon dioxide makes up only 0.3% of the total amount of gas.

There are five production wells at the Corrib field, drilled by Transocean Sedco 711 semi-submersible drilling rig. Each well has a "christmas tree" structure above it that contains the control and monitoring equipment. This subsea production system was constructed by Vetco, the offshore drilling and production supplier. Flexible individual flowlines will run from each well to a production manifold which will feed the gas into the main pipeline.  There is no production platform installed in the field. Production at the gas field is remotely controlled from the Bellanaboy Bridge terminal.

Pipeline
The pipeline from the Corrib field to the landfall at Glengad is approximately 90 km in length. Work on the offshore section took place in summer 2009 and involved over 7,000 lengths of pipe being welded together on board the Solitaire pipelaying vessel.

Processing plant
Gas is processed at the processing plant inland, near Bellanaboy Bridge.  The purpose of the plant is to dry the gas and remove impurities. The plant has a capacity of 10 million standard cubic metres of purified gas per day. Processed gas is fed to the Bord Gáis gas grid. The piping for the onshore processing plant was manufactured by Phoenix Pipes Limited in Slane, Co. Meath.

Controversy

Some opponents of the scheme cited concerns about the health, safety and environmental impact of the onshore aspects of the project. Others were concerned with alleged irregularities and precedents surrounding the project. Many groups, most notably the Rossport Five and Shell to Sea campaigns, opposed the current plans for the project, which they regarded as dangerous despite assurances from Shell.
 A contrary position is taken by the group Pro Gas Mayo.

A film about the project, The Pipe, was released on 8 July 2010 at the Galway Film Festival.

Safety and environmental concerns

Pipeline route
The upstream high pressure gas pipeline connecting the wells to the inland processing site runs through the area of Rossport, close to local residences. A report by Dr. Richard Kupriewicz concluded that "the terrain makes escape routes for the clustered population essentially impossible in the event of a [pipeline] rupture".

Discharges from drying process
Broadhaven Bay is the proposed area to discharge waste from the refining process

Planning problems
Planning permission was initially refused by the board of An Bord Pleanála (the Irish planning authority). Senior planning inspector Kevin Moore's report stated in part: 

In November 2009, An Bord Pleanála ordered Shell to redesign the pipeline and move its route away from homes saying it posed an "unacceptable risk".

Tax
Claims of a tax yield of some €1.7 billion over the life of the field have been made by the Irish government, based on data about the field's size and 2008 gas prices. Until 2007, the Irish Petroleum Licensing Terms imposed a flat 25% income tax on gas production revenues. In August 2007, the top rate of tax on the most profitable fields was increased to 40%.
The new licensing terms called for changes to the tax imposed based upon fields' profit ratios (equal to the rate of profit less 25% divided by the accumulated level of capital investment). Where this ratio is greater than 4.5, an additional 15% tax was imposed, where it is between 3.0 and 4.5 an additional 10% was imposed and where the profit ratio is between 1.5 and 3.0, and additional 5% tax was added. Less profitable fields were not affected.

Employment

The construction of the pipeline and plant was expected by Shell's economic consultants, Goodbody Economic Consultants, to create 800 temporary jobs  and boost the local Mayo economy by approximately €181 million. The plant was expected by Shell to employ approximately 55 workers when operational.

References

Further reading

External links
 Trailer for 'The Pipe' released 8 July 2010 - Galway Film Festival
 'Pipe Down' film - winner - Waterford Film Festival 2010
Project Website
Corrib Gas Pipeline
Project Overview and History
Centre For Public Inquiry's review of events surrounding the Corrib gas project
Technical details of proposed pipeline from Accufacts Inc.
Mayo Gas Info
Advantica's review of onshore pipeline
Bitter dispute over gas pipeline — BBC news article on controversy

Corrib gas controversy
Geography of County Mayo
Natural gas fields in Ireland
Politics of County Mayo
Shell plc oil and gas fields